A Sea of Faces is an album by avant-garde jazz saxophonist Archie Shepp recorded in Milan, Italy, on August 4 and 5, 1975, and released on the Italian Black Saint label. It features performances by Shepp with Charles Greenlee, Dave Burrell, Cameron Brown, Beaver Harris, Rafi Taha and Bunny Foy.

Track listing 
 "Hipnosis" (Grachan Moncur III) – 26:10
 "Song for Mozambique/Poem: A Sea of Faces" (Semenya McCord/Archie Shepp) – 8:12
 "I Know 'Bout the Life" (Aishah Rahman, Archie Shepp) – 5:20
 "Lookin' for Someone to Love" (Cal Massey) – 9:34
 Recorded in Milan, Italy, August 4 & 5, 1975

Personnel 
Archie Shepp - tenor saxophone, soprano saxophone, piano, vocals
Charles Greenlee - trombone, tambourine, vocals
Dave Burrell - piano
Cameron Brown - bass
Beaver Harris - drums, tambourine, vocals
Rafi Taha - vocals
Bunny Foy - vocals, maracas, percussion

References

Black Saint/Soul Note albums
Archie Shepp albums
1975 albums